This is a list of public holidays in Libya.

Public holidays 

In addition, the following Muslim holidays, which may take place according to the Islamic Calendar (Hijri year), are observed as public holidays:

See also 
 Day of Revenge, historical

References

 
Holidays
Libyan culture
Libya